Tatu is a 2017 Nigerian adventure film directed by Don Omope. It was written by Jude Idada and is an adaptation of the novel "Tatu", written by Abraham Nwankwo in 2014. The film received several nominations at the 2018 Africa Magic Viewers Choice Awards. The film also received joint most nominations at the 2018 Africa Magic Choice Awards.

Synopsis
In Tatu, we see the life of a mother and her attempt to salvage the idea of her only daughter being given away as a sacrifice for the atonement of sins.

Production
Tatu was shot in locations across Lagos, and Abuja. It was shot in a span of 12 months.

Cast
 Toyin Abraham
 Segun Arinze
 Gabriel Afolayan
 Desmond Elliott
 Rahama Sadau
 Sambasa Nzeribe
 Funlola Aofiyebi-Raimi
 Hafiz ‘Saka’ Oyetoro
 Frank Donga

Release
Tatu was first theatrically released on July 2017 in Nigeria, and was premiered at the Eko Hotel Convention Centre, Victoria Island. In 2019, the movie was added to Netflix's catalogue as the company continued to invest in the African Film industry.

Reception
Tatu was mildly received by the public. For most of it viewers, the movie had potentials that were not met. On Nollywood Reinvented, the movie had a rating of 52%.

Accolades

References

External links 

 
 

English-language Nigerian films
2017 films
2010s adventure films
Nigerian adventure films
Films shot in Lagos
Films shot in Abuja
2010s English-language films